Soul on Ice is the debut album by West Coast emcee Ras Kass, released on October 1, 1996, under Priority Records. The album was produced by Ras Kass, as well as Battlecat, Vooodu, Lamont "Bird" Holdby, Michael "Flip" Barber, Michael Schlesinger, and Reno Delajuan. Fellow West Coast rapper Coolio makes the only guest appearance on the album on the song "Drama". The album's title is a reference to Black Panther member Eldridge Cleaver's 1968 book Soul on Ice. Two charting singles were released from the album, "Anything Goes" and "Soul on Ice". It received minimal commercial attention at the time of its release, but has since garnered retrospective critical praise for Ras Kass' complex, historically-aware lyricism.

Background
An avid reader in his youth, Ras Kass adopted his stage name in honor of Ethiopian emperor Ras Kassa. In 1993, with funding from his high school friend and then-Atlanta Falcons offensive tackle Bob Whitfield, Ras Kass recorded his demo. The following year, under Whitfield's label PatchWerk Recordings, Ras Kass released his first single "Remain Anonymous". The success of the single, which garnered critical praise in The Source December 1994 issue, led to him signing a deal with Priority Records.

The album's title was inspired by Black Panther member Eldridge Cleaver's 1968 book Soul on Ice, from which Ras Kass formed many of his lyrical themes. The album's seven-minute long track, "Nature of the Threat", has been described as "an exploration of racism throughout history" and a "history lesson". Ras Kass described how he gathered the information to create the track:

In a six-month period leading up to the album's release, Ras Kass was featured in The Source "Hip-Hop Quotable" column and twice featured in Rap Pages "Rhyme of the Month" column, earning a reputation as a highly skilled lyricist.

Critical reception

Will Ashon of Muzik praised Soul on Ice as "a powerful journey through Ras' life, grounded in a historical-political-theological analysis of the plight of the black race", concluding that it was "post-encyclopedia-black-power-lyricism". Carlito Rodriguez of The Source commended Ras Kass' lyricism, stating that he "drops material that'll have history buffs, religious theorists and English majors alike either reaching for their reference books or bustin' off in their Fruit of the Looms".

In a retrospective piece, Stylus Magazine critic Brett Berliner noted that several years into Ras Kass' career, "he still hasn't matched the awe and skill of Soul on Ice", hailing it as "one of the most next level albums of all time, lyrically". Steve Juon of RapReviews.com commented that the album "still stands as a testament to what an MC with unlimited potential and the free reign to say it can truly do".

Track listing

Samples
Anything Goes
"Oooh This Love Is So" by Al B. Sure!
"Blue Suede Shoes" by Carl Perkins
Reelishymn
"Goin' Out of My Head" by Little Anthony and the Imperials
Drama
"Tryin' to Get the Feeling Again" by Hubert Laws
"Gin and Juice" by Snoop Dogg
"High Snobiety" by Ralph Marco Band
Etc.
"How Many MC's..." by Black Moon
"The Mighty Quinn (Quinn the Eskimo)" by Ramsey Lewis
"Moshitup" by Just-Ice feat. KRS-One
If/Then
"Stay Still (And Let Me Love You)" by Ronnie Laws
"Bitches Ain't Shit by Dr. Dre
Marinatin'
"You Gots to Chill" by EPMD
On Earth as It Is...
"Spinning Wheel" by Lonnie Smith
"La Dolce Vita" by Sparks
"10% Dis" by MC Lyte
Sonset
"You're Gettin' a Little Too Smart" by The Detroit Emeralds
"Eric B. Is President" by Eric B. & Rakim
"Underground" by EPMD
Soul on Ice
"School Boy Crush" by Average White Band
The Evil That Men Do
"Kool Is Back" by Funk, Inc.
"Barefoot Ballet" by John Klemmer
"Color Blind" by Ice Cube, WC and the Maad Circle
Ordo Abchao (Order Out of Choas)
"Universe" by Hampton Hawes

Charts

References

Ras Kass albums
1996 debut albums
Albums produced by Battlecat (producer)
Priority Records albums